Funtumia africana is a tree within the Apocynaceae family, it is one of two species within the genus Funtumia.

Description 
Tree can grow up to 30 meters high but usually smaller, trunk is straight, cylindrical and may sometimes have buttress roots, smooth bark, greenish-brown to grey in colour with soft - light wood properties. Leaves, simple, opposite arrangement, glabrous, leathery surface, petiole 3 - 15 mm. Leaf-blade,  elliptical to ovate in outline, size, 5 x 32 cm long and 1.7 x 17 cm wide, acuminate apex, cuneate at the base; lamina coriaceous, 8 - 14 pairs of lateral veins. Creamy - yellow, fragrant flower, Fruits, grey - brown and usually fusiform shaped,

Distribution
Occurs in the forest zones of Lower and Upper Guinea and southwards up to Mozambique.

Chemistry
Contain conanine, a group in a class of steroidal alkaloids.

Traditional use
Latex used as an ingredient for arrow poison by the Guere people of Ivory Coast, latex extracts obtained from the species can be used to produce birdlime but useless as a rubber.  Other extracts from the species are used to treat burns and incontinence. Wood is used to produce cheap furniture.

References

Flora of Mozambique
Flora of West Tropical Africa
Malouetieae